This is a list of Billboard magazine's Top Hot 100 songs of 1995.

See also
1995 in music
List of Billboard Hot 100 number-one singles of 1995
List of Billboard Hot 100 top-ten singles in 1995

References

1995 record charts
Billboard charts